Anonas Street is a street located in Quezon City, Philippines. It is a notable road in a generally north-south orientation between the intersection with Madasalin Street in Diliman and the junction with Aurora Boulevard in Project 3. It is served by Anonas Station of the LRT Line 2 and a namesake station in the future on the Metro Manila Subway.

The street was named after the Anonas family who originated from Iba, Zambales, settled in this area and built a factory near the river.

Route
Anonas Street serves as a continuation of Matino Street at the intersection with Madasalin Street in the northwest. It turns south then southeast and crosses some major intersections such as Victoriano Luna Avenue and Kamias Road. Then it crosses several one-way roads namely K-6th Street, K-7th Street, and K-10th Street. Then it travels southeast again crossing Lantana Street and Acacia Street. Then it travels further southeast and crosses Bignay Street and Chico Street. And then it would shift several times from southeast to southwest wherein it would cross vital one-way roads that are public transport routes as well as border roads between Projects 2 and 3 which are Tindalo Street and Molave Street. It then finally straightens up and terminates at the junction with Aurora Boulevard.

Landmarks
Notable establishments and landmarks on Anonas Street include Savemore Anonas, Datu Sikatuna Statue Circle, Quezon City Police District Police Station 9, The 70's Bistro, Mariposa Budget Hotel, Sidetrix Adult Entertainment, Barangay Quirino 2-A Barangay Hall, World Citi College and World City Medical Center.

References

Streets in Quezon City